Elizabeth Jenny Rosemary Sanderson, Baroness Sanderson of Welton (born 24 May 1971) is a British political advisor, life peer, and former journalist.

As a journalist, she worked at the Mail on Sunday for 17 years. She was a special adviser and Head of Features to Prime Minister (formerly Home Secretary) Theresa May from 2014 to 2019.

In September 2019, it was announced that she would be made a Conservative Party life peer in the 2019 Prime Minister's Resignation Honours. On 8 October 2019, she was made Baroness Sanderson of Welton, of Welton in the East Riding of Yorkshire. She was introduced to the House of Lords on 22 October 2019. She made her maiden speech on 31 October 2019 during the Lords consideration of the Phase 1 Report of the Grenfell Tower Inquiry.

In September 2022, she was appointed by the Government as the independent chair of an advisory panel to help develop a new strategy for public libraries.

References

1971 births
Living people
British special advisers
21st-century British journalists
British women journalists
Conservative Party (UK) life peers
Conservative Party (UK) people
Life peers created by Elizabeth II